Tivim Assembly constituency is one of the 40 Legislative Assembly constituencies of Goa state in India. Tivim is also one of the 20 constituencies falling under the North Goa Lok Sabha constituency.

It is part of North Goa district.

Members of Legislative Assembly

Election results

2022 result

2017 election

2012 election

References

External links
  

North Goa district
Assembly constituencies of Goa